Parya Chaka (Quechua parya reddish, copper or sparrow, chaka bridge, "reddish (copper or sparrow) bridge", Hispanicized spelling Pariachaca) is a mountain in the south of the Paryaqaqa or Waruchiri mountain range in the Andes of Peru, about  high. It is also the name of a lake near the mountain. The mountain is located in the Lima Region, Huarochirí Province, Quinti District, and in the Yauyos Province, Tanta District. It is situated southwest of Paryaqaqa. It is situated within the borders of the Nor Yauyos-Cochas Landscape Reserve.

It lies in a row between Ch'uspiqucha in the northeast and P'itiqucha in the southwest.

References

Mountains of Peru
Mountains of Lima Region
Lakes of Peru
Lakes of Lima Region